Schistocerca rubiginosa, the rusty bird grasshopper, is a species of bird grasshopper in the family Acrididae. It is found in North America and South America.

References

Further reading

External links

 

Acrididae
Articles created by Qbugbot
Insects described in 1863